Christiane Fürst (born 29 March 1985 in Dresden) is a retired German female volleyball player. She plays for Turkish side Eczacıbaşı VitrA.

Career
She won a bronze medal at the 2003 Women's European Volleyball Championship.

Fürst was named Best Blocker at the 2006 and 2010 World Championships. She won the 2007–08 CEV Cup with the Italian team Scavolini Pesaro, and was named "Best Spiker". She won the bronze medal at the 2010–11 CEV Champions League with Fenerbahçe Acıbadem. As part of the Vakıfbank Spor Kulübü, she won CEV Women's Champions League in 2012–2013 season.

At the 2013 European Championship, she took the silver medal with her National Team.

Fürst won the gold medal at the 2013 Club World Championship and the Best Middle Blocker award, playing with Vakıfbank Istanbul.

Clubs
  Dresdner SC (1995–2007)
  Scavolini Pesaro (2007–2009)
  Foppapedretti Bergamo (2009–2010)
  Fenerbahçe Acıbadem (2010–2011)
  VakıfBank Türk Telekom (2011–2014)
  Eczacıbaşı VitrA (2014-2016)
  Denso Airybees (2016-2018)

Awards

Individuals
 2006 World Championship "Best Blocker"
 2007 Montreux Volley Masters "Best Blocker"
 2007–08 CEV Cup Final Four "Best Spiker"
 2009 European Championships "Best Blocker"
 2009 German Volleyball Player of the Year
 2009/10 Italian League "Best Server"
 2009-10 Italian League "Best Blocker"
 2010 World Championship "Best Blocker"
 2011 Montreux Volley Masters "Best Scorer"
 2011 Montreux Volley Masters "Best Blocker"
 2011 European Championship "Best Blocker"
 2011 World Cup "Best Blocker" 2013 European Championship "Best Blocker" 2013 FIVB Women's Club World Championship "Best Middle Blocker" 2014–15 CEV Champions League "Fair Play Award"''

National team
 2003 European Championship —  Bronze Medal
 2011 European Championship —  Silver Medal
 2013 European Championship —  Silver Medal

Clubs
 1998–99 German League Championship –  Champion, with Dresdner SC
 1998–99 German Cup –  Champion, with Dresdner SC
 2001–2002 German Cup –  Champion, with Dresdner SC
 2006–07 German League Championship –  Champion, with Dresdner SC
 2007–08 Italian Championship –  Champion, with Scavolini Pesaro
 2007–08 CEV Cup –  Champion, with Scavolini Pesaro
 2008–09 Italian Cup –  Champion, with Scavolini Pesaro
 2008–09 Italian Supercup –  Champion, with Scavolini Pesaro
 2008–09 Italian Championship –  Champion, with Scavolini Pesaro
 2009/10 CEV Champions League –  Champion, with Volley Bergamo
 2010 FIVB World Club Championship –  Champion, with Fenerbahçe Acıbadem
 2010 Turkish Super Cup –  Champion, with Fenerbahçe Acıbadem
 2010–11 CEV Champions League –  Bronze medal, with Fenerbahçe Acıbadem
 2010–11 Turkish League –  Champion, with Fenerbahçe Acıbadem
 2011 FIVB Women's Club World Championship –  Runner-Up, with VakıfBank Türk Telekom
 2011-12 Turkish League –  Runner-Up, with Vakıfbank Spor Kulübü
 2012-13 Turkish Cup –  Champion, with Vakıfbank Spor Kulübü
 2012–13 CEV Champions League –  Champion, with Vakıfbank Spor Kulübü
 2012-13 Turkish League –  Champion, with Vakıfbank Spor Kulübü
 2013 Club World Championship -  Champion, with Vakıfbank Istanbul
 2014–15 CEV Champions League -  Champion, with Eczacıbaşı VitrA
 2015 Club World Championship -  Champion, with Eczacıbaşı VitrA

References

External links
 Christiane Fürst at the International Volleyball Federation
 
 Christiane Furst at the Italian Women's Volleyball League
 
 

1985 births
Living people
German women's volleyball players
Fenerbahçe volleyballers
Volleyball players at the 2004 Summer Olympics
Olympic volleyball players of Germany
Sportspeople from Dresden
German expatriate sportspeople in Turkey
German expatriate sportspeople in Japan
20th-century German women
21st-century German women